{{DISPLAYTITLE:NZR OB class}}

The OB class was the first class of steam locomotives constructed by the Baldwin Locomotive Works for the Wellington and Manawatu Railway Company (WMR) in New Zealand. The class consisted of two locomotives ordered in 1888, and they entered service in September of that year as WMR No.'s 11 and 12. 

When the WMR and its locomotive fleet was acquired by the government and merged into the national New Zealand Railways (NZR) in 1908, the two locomotives were considered to be similar to the O class but with enough differences to warrant the separate OB classification. No. 11 became OB 455 and No. 12 became OB 456, and they ended their days working around Napier. OB 456 was retired in September 1929, and was followed in March 1931 by OB 455, which had survived to be one of the final operating locomotives of WMR heritage, along with NC 461 and UD 465, both of which were withdrawn in the same month.

External links
 New Zealand Steam locomotives — OB class

Notes

References 

 
 
 

Ob class
2-8-0 locomotives
Baldwin locomotives
Scrapped locomotives
Railway locomotives introduced in 1888
3 ft 6 in gauge locomotives of New Zealand